Satan Tempts with Love is a 1960 French-West German crime film directed by Rudolf Jugert and starring Belinda Lee, Joachim Hansen and Ivan Desny.

It was known in France as Les port des illusions and on American TV as Devil's Choice.

Plot
Carlos escapes from prison and meets Robert, who is carrying money that he has stolen from the bank where he was working. Carlos uses his girlfriend Evelyn, a singer, to steal the money so they can sail to Australia. However Evelyn falls for Robert.

Cast
 Belinda Lee as Evelyn
 Joachim Hansen as Robert
 Ivan Desny as Carlos
 Heinz Engelmann as Kapitän Philipp
 Peter Capell as Geck
 Osman Ragheb as Li Fang
 Dorothee Parker as Laura

Production
Lee had previously appeared in the German film She Walks By Night produced by Jugert.

Filming started in Munich on 14 December 1959 under the title Katja.

It was known during filming as Liebe um Mitternacht.

References

Bibliography
 Bergfelder, Tim. International Adventures: German Popular Cinema and European Co-Productions in the 1960s. Berghahn Books, 2005.

External links 
 
 
Satan Tempts with Love at Letterbox DVD

1960 films
1960 crime films
German crime films
French crime films
West German films
1960s German-language films
Films directed by Rudolf Jugert
Films set in France
1960s German films
1960s French films